Frank McCoppin (July 4, 1834 – May 26, 1897) was the first Irish-born, and foreign-born Mayor of San Francisco.

Career
McCoppin was a member of the Royal Irish Constabulary from 1851 until he emigrated to the United States in 1853.  In 1860, he was made supervisor of the Market Street Railway, where he encouraged planting among the railroad tracks, to lessen the problem of drifting sands.  Shortly thereafter, he was elected to the San Francisco Board of Supervisors.  He then was elected mayor in 1867, serving from December 2, 1867, to December 5, 1869. He and the Board of Supervisors approved the plan for Golden Gate Park January 14, 1868.  However, questions regarding his citizenship (word had leaked that he was not a naturalized U.S. citizen when he was supervisor or that he applied for citizenship during his term) led to his defeat in the 1869 election.

In 1886, he ran for a seat in the United States House of Representatives but lost to William W. Morrow.  He later served two terms in the California State Senate.  In 1894, President Grover Cleveland appointed him Postmaster of San Francisco, a position he held until his death from stomach cancer on May 26, 1897.

He is credited with recommending the use of ladybugs to control insect pests affecting the California citrus crop.

Personal life
In 1862, he was married to Elizabeth Bird Van Ness in San Francisco, thereby becoming the son-in-law of former mayor James Van Ness.

A small park, McCoppin Square, located in the Parkside District of San Francisco, is named in his honor, as are McCoppin Street in the Mission District and Frank McCoppin Elementary School, near Golden Gate Park.

Sources
 Heintz, William F., San Francisco's Mayors:  1850-1880. From the Gold Rush to the Silver Bonanza.  Woodside, CA:  Gilbert Roberts Publications, 1975. (Library of Congress Card No. 75-17094)

External links
 Mairead O'Shea, "Longford son brought the ladybird to the Americans"
 November 1886 California election results

19th-century Irish people
Politicians from County Longford
Mayors of San Francisco
California state senators
Deaths from cancer in California
Deaths from stomach cancer
Royal Irish Constabulary officers
1834 births
1897 deaths
Irish emigrants to the United States (before 1923)
19th-century American politicians